Curtains is a Canadian short film, directed by Stephanie Morgenstern and Mark Morgenstern and released in 1995. The film was a Genie Award nominee for Best Theatrical Short Film at the 17th Genie Awards in 1996.

Plot 
An actress, having just discovered she's been dumped, questions everything around her in the 15 minutes before the curtain comes up and she must take her place on stage. In the process, we get a glance at what goes on behind the scenes in your average theatre production.

References

External links 

1995 short films
1995 films
Canadian drama short films
1990s Canadian films